Flesland is a village in the borough of Ytrebygda in the municipality of Bergen in Vestland county, Norway. It is the site of Bergen Airport, Flesland and Flesland Air Station.

Name
The village is named after the old Flesland farm, and the Old Norse form of the name was probably Flesjaland. The first element is the genitive plural of fles which means "skerry" or "sunken rock" and the last element is land which means "land" or "farm".

References

Villages in Vestland
Neighbourhoods of Bergen